Rob Hubbard (born 1955 in Kingston upon Hull, England) is a British composer best known for his musical and programming work for microcomputers of the 1980s, such as the Commodore 64.

Early life
Hubbard first started playing music at age seven. Whilst at school he played in bands. After leaving school, he went to music college.

Early career
In the late seventies, before scoring games, he was a professional studio musician. He decided to teach himself BASIC and machine code for the Commodore 64.

Music on the Commodore 64
He approached Gremlin Graphics in 1985 to promote a few demos and a music-education program he had written, but Gremlin was more interested in his music than his software.  He was asked to create the soundtrack for Thing on a Spring, a platform game.

Hubbard subsequently wrote or converted music for a variety of publishers on over 75 games between 1985 and 1989 such as Monty on the Run, Crazy Comets, Master of Magic and Commando. Some of his most popular tunes include also Warhawk, Delta, Thrust, Lightforce, Spellbound, Sanxion, Auf Wiedersehen Monty and International Karate. The game Knucklebusters includes Hubbard's longest tune: a 17-minute opus. Hubbard has mentioned his personal favourites are Kentilla, W.A.R. and Sanxion.  His least favourite was Samantha Fox Strip Poker, which he admitted to having done purely for money; he was listed in the game credits with the alias John York. He has stated that he had many musical influences including Jean Michel Jarre, Larry Fast and other synth bands.

Hubbard mainly composed for the Commodore 64's SID sound chip. He worked freelance and turned down offers from companies to work in-house.

Move to Electronic Arts and the United States
After working for several different companies, he left Newcastle in 1988 and had the choice to work for Electronic Arts or Microsoft. Hubbard chose EA due to their prominence in the gaming industry as Microsoft had (as yet) no gaming platform. His work with EA Electronic Arts in America was as a composer. He was the first person devoted to sound and music at EA and did everything from low-level programming to composing. One of his most famous compositions during his period at EA, is the music featured in the loading sequence of the Commodore 64 version of Skate or Die, which features multiple sampled chords of electric guitar and organ. Playback of samples was facilitated by exploiting a feature in the SID sound-synthesizer chip: altering the volume register produces an audible click, and altering the register thousands of times per second enables a relatively crude (but surprisingly clear and sophisticated for eight-bit computers) form of sample playback.
He eventually became Audio Technical Director, a more administrative job, deciding which technologies to use in games, and which to develop further.

After the Commodore 64 period, he wrote some soundtracks for games which appeared on the Amiga, Atari ST, IBM PC and Sega Mega Drive.

Recent activities
Hubbard recently contributed a few re-arrangements of his themes to Chris Abbott's C64 tribute Back in Time Live. Hubbard has performed several times with the Danish C64 cover band PRESS PLAY ON TAPE who have covered many of his early tunes using a full rock-band arrangement. Hubbard has also performed his old music on piano with the support of violinist and fellow chiptune composer Mark Knight.

Hubbard left EA in 2002 and returned to England. He has recently resumed playing in a band, and he has revisited his past game-music work in concert. His recent compositions have included music for mobile-phone games.

In 2005, music from International Karate was performed live by a full orchestra at the third Symphonic Game Music Concert. The event took place in Leipzig, Germany. Hubbard arranged and orchestrated the piece.

In 2014, Hubbard appeared in and composed music for the documentary feature film From Bedrooms to Billions, a film that tells the story of the British video games industry.

In November 2016, Hubbard received an honorary degree from Abertay University for his contributions to video-game music in the 1980s.

Works

References

External links
C64Audio.com

1955 births
British male composers
Chiptune musicians
Commodore 64 music
Living people
Musicians from Kingston upon Hull
Video game composers